The Alderstown School for the Deaf (founded in 1954) is a Special Basic Education Institution along Skinn Road in Warri, Delta State, Nigeria. It is a specialist primary school for children aged 4–12 or more who are deaf or have hearing and speech difficulties.

Reconstruction
During Governor Emmanuel Uduaghan's administration, the Delta State government embarked upon a reconstruction project in the school. The school was considered as "one of the most deplorable and desecrated school in the heart of Warri which has been given a facelift by the Uduaghan's administration."

See also
 Cavagina Primary School

References

External links
 "Hoodlums seize troubled Delta school". The Nation. 2007-05-23.

Primary schools in Nigeria
Special schools in Nigeria